The 1991 Goody's 500 was the 24th stock car race of the 1991 NASCAR Winston Cup Series season and the 43rd iteration of the event. The race was held on Sunday, September 22, 1991, in Martinsville, Virginia at Martinsville Speedway, a  permanent oval-shaped short track. The race took the scheduled 500 laps to complete. In the final laps of the race, Leo Jackson Motorsports driver Harry Gant would mount a late-race charge to the lead after being spun on lap 376 of the race. After passing for the lead on lap 454, Gant was able to defend the field for the final laps of the race to take his 16th career NASCAR Winston Cup Series victory, his fifth and final victory of the season, and his fourth straight victory. To fill out the top three, King Racing driver Brett Bodine and Richard Childress Racing driver Dale Earnhardt would finish second and third, respectively.

With the victory, Gant, having won four out of the five races that occurred within the month of September of 1991, Gant would earn the nickname "Mr. September" by NASCAR media.

Background 

Martinsville Speedway is an NASCAR-owned stock car racing track located in Henry County, in Ridgeway, Virginia, just to the south of Martinsville. At 0.526 miles (0.847 km) in length, it is the shortest track in the NASCAR Cup Series. The track was also one of the first paved oval tracks in NASCAR, being built in 1947 by H. Clay Earles. It is also the only remaining race track that has been on the NASCAR circuit from its beginning in 1948.

Entry list 

 (R) denotes rookie driver.

Qualifying 
Qualifying was split into two rounds. The first round was held on Friday, September 20, at 3:00 PM EST. Each driver would have one lap to set a time. During the first round, the top 20 drivers in the round would be guaranteed a starting spot in the race. If a driver was not able to guarantee a spot in the first round, they had the option to scrub their time from the first round and try and run a faster lap time in a second round qualifying run, held on Saturday, September 21, at 12:30 PM EST. As with the first round, each driver would have one lap to set a time. For this specific race, positions 21-30 would be decided on time, and depending on who needed it, a select amount of positions were given to cars who had not otherwise qualified but were high enough in owner's points; up to two provisionals were given. If needed, a past champion who did not qualify on either time or provisionals could use a champion's provisional, adding one more spot to the field.

Jimmy Means was the only driver to fail to qualify.

Full qualifying results

Race results

Standings after the race 

Drivers' Championship standings

Note: Only the first 10 positions are included for the driver standings.

References 

1991 NASCAR Winston Cup Series
NASCAR races at Martinsville Speedway
September 1991 sports events in the United States
1991 in sports in Virginia